The Zimbabwe Academy of Music, founded in 1949, is a music school and non-profit organization in the Famona suburb of Bulawayo, Zimbabwe.

References

External links

Schools in Zimbabwe
Buildings and structures in Bulawayo
Educational institutions established in 1949
Education in Bulawayo
1949 establishments in Southern Rhodesia